Bodkin may refer to:

 Bodkin (surname), a list of people and one fictional character
 One of the fourteen Tribes of Galway
 A dagger
 Bodkin, U.S. Virgin Islands, a settlement on Saint Croix
 Bodkin Island, Maryland, United States – see Bodkin Island Light
 Bodkin point, a type of arrowhead
 Bodkin needle, a variety of sewing needle

See also
 Botkin, a surname